"Egypt" is a song by Bethel Music and Cory Asbury, which was released as the third single from Bethel Music's twelfth live album, Revival's in the Air (2020), on April 3, 2020. The song was written by Phil Wickham, Brian Johnson, Cory Asbury, Ethan Hulse, and Lee Cummings. It celebrates God’s faithfulness with reference to the story of the Israelites' deliverance from Egypt to their Promised Land. Brian Johnson also collaborated on the production of the single with Joel Taylor.

Background
On April 3, 2020, Bethel Music released that "Egypt" as the third single to their album, Revival's in the Air (2020), which was initially marketed as God of Revival at the time that the single was released. It was preceded by Bethel's releases of "God of Revival" and "We Praise You" as singles, as well as Asbury's remix of "Reckless Love" featuring Tori Kelly, "The Father's House" and "Christ Be Magnified". 

Cory Asbury shared the story behind the song, which first came to view in 2017 following his family's move from Colorado Springs to Kalamazoo, Michigan, saying: 

On June 18, 2021, Cory Asbury released the studio version of "Egypt" on digital platforms. Asbury's studio version of "Egypt" impacted Christian radio stations in the United States on July 30, 2021.

Composition

Commercial performance
The live version of "Egypt" debuted at No. 37 on the US Hot Christian Songs chart dated April 18, 2021, concurrently charting at No. 8 on the Christian Digital Song Sales chart. It went on to peak at No. 34 on the chart, and spent a total of seven non-consecutive weeks on Hot Christian Songs Chart.

The studio version of "Egypt" debuted at No. 48 on the US Christian Airplay chart dated August 21, 2021. The song then entered the Hot Christian Songs chart dated October 23, 2021, at No. 50.

Music videos
Bethel Music released the live music video of "Egypt" with Cory Asbury leading the song at Bethel Church through their YouTube channel on April 3, 2020.

Track listing

Charts

Weekly charts

Year-end charts

Release history

Other versions
 Cain and Essential Worship released a cover of the song as a standalone single.

References

External links
  on PraiseCharts

2020 singles
2020 songs
Bethel Music songs
Cory Asbury songs
Songs written by  Ethan Hulse